Ek Din Ka Sultan (King For A Day) is a 1945 Hindi/Urdu historical drama film produced and directed by Sohrab Modi with story by Agha Jani Kashmiri. The production company was Minerva Movietone with cinematography by Y. D. Sarpotdar. The music was composed by Rafiq Ghaznavi, Shanti Kumar Desai and D. Gadkar with lyrics by Wali Saheb. The stars featuring in the film were Mehtab, Wasti, Pratima Devi, Ghulam Hussain and Ghory.

The film was a "minor historical" using a small incident from the time of Emperor Humayun's reign. Gangar cites that Ek Din Ka Sultan was hailed as a "well-directed" film with "some beautiful production values".

Cast
 Sohrab Modi
 Mehtab
 Wasti
 Sadiq Ali
 Ghulam Mohammed
 A. Shah
 Pratima Devi
 Ghory
 Amir Banu
 Shantarin

Soundtrack
The film's music was composed by three music directors, Rafiq Ghaznavi, Shanti Kumar Desai and Dattaram V. Gadkar with the lyrics written by Wali Saheb. Playback singing was provided by Amirbai Karnataki, G. M. Durrani, Zohrabai Ambalewali and Rafiq Ghaznavi.

Song List

References

External links

1945 films
1940s Hindi-language films
Films scored by Shanti Kumar Desai
Films scored by Walter Kaufmann
Films scored by Rafiq Ghaznavi
Films directed by Sohrab Modi
Films set in the Mughal Empire
Films about royalty
Indian black-and-white films
1940s historical drama films
Indian historical drama films
1940s Urdu-language films
1945 drama films
Urdu-language Indian films